Henry A. Wise Jr. (August 3, 1920 – May 2, 2003) was an American physician and World War II Tuskegee Airman fighter pilot with the 99th Pursuit Squadron, 332nd Division. He was shot down over Romania and was a prisoner of war. After the war, he became the medical director at Bowie State University.

Early life
Wise was born in Cheriton, Virginia and he graduated from the all black private school, Virginia Union University.

Career

From 1942 to 1946 served as a pilot in the Tuskegee Airmen. Wise's plane was shot down over Romania near the Polesti oilfields. He spent three months as a prisoner of war.

In 1955 Wise left his family practice to become work as a physician at Prince George's Hospital Center. At that time Wise was the only African American physician. He went on to become the former medical director at Bowie State University

Dr. Henry A. Wise, Jr. High School was approved by the Board of Education for Prince George's County Schools in 2005.

Awards
Air Medal 
Certificate of Valor for Courage in Combat
Congressional Gold Medal awarded to the Tuskegee Airmen in 2006
Pioneer Award for Distinguished Service and Historic Achievement.
Purple Heart

See also
 Dogfights (TV series)
 Executive Order 9981
 List of Tuskegee Airmen
 Military history of African Americans
 The Tuskegee Airmen (movie)

Death
Wise suffered a heart attack and died at Prince George's Hospital Center on May 2, 2003.

References

Notes

External links
 Fly (2009 play about the 332d Fighter Group)
Tuskegee Airmen at Tuskegee University
 Tuskegee Airmen Archives at the University of California, Riverside Libraries.
 Tuskegee Airmen, Inc.
 Tuskegee Airmen National Historic Site (U.S. National Park Service) 
 Tuskegee Airmen National Museum

1920 births
2003 deaths
African-American physicians
Physicians from Maryland
American World War II flying aces
Aviators from Virginia
People from Cheriton, Virginia
Recipients of the Air Medal
Tuskegee Airmen
United States Army Air Forces officers
African-American aviators
21st-century African-American people
World War II prisoners of war